Overton or Overton-on-Dee is a village and community in Wrexham County Borough, Wales. It is situated close to the Welsh-English border on the edge of an escarpment that winds its way around the course of the River Dee, from which Overton-on-Dee derives its name.

The community of Overton, which also includes the village of Lightwood Green and a number of small hamlets including Knolton, had a total population of 1,276 at the 2001 census, increasing to 1,382 at the 2011 Census.

Geography 
Its neighbouring villages are Bangor-on-Dee and Penley whilst the small towns of Ellesmere and Ruabon are only a short distance away.

History 
The settlement is not mentioned in the Domesday Book, but was first recorded in 1195, via a 14th-century source, as Ouerton. Its name was also recorded as Overtone in 1201, Awtun, in the 14th century and Ortyn in the 15th, all of which are forms of a name meaning "settlement on the bank [of the Dee]". A castle was built here in the 12th century by Madog ap Maredudd, a prince of Powys: Overton was granted the right to a weekly market and annual fair in 1279 by the English king  and became a borough by royal charter in 1292, at which time 56 taxpayers lived there.  One of Overton's earliest appearances in history was as one of the first targets of the revolt of 1294–95, led by Madog ap Llywelyn.

Overton is situated in a former exclave of the traditional county of Flintshire known as Maelor Saesneg. In 1536, under the rule of Henry VIII, it was included into the county of Flintshire, forming the Hundred of Maelor. Although part of Flintshire, Overton was within an exclave, surrounded by Cheshire, Shropshire and Denbighshire, and became the administrative centre of the area, often referred to as Flintshire Detached, which included the villages of Bangor on Dee, Bettisfield, Bronington, Hanmer, Knolton, Penley, Tybroughton, Willington and Worthenbury.

In 1887 a Boundary Commission was appointed to review the boundaries of counties in England and Wales. At an inquiry in Overton, it was found that most of the population of the area favoured it becoming part of Shropshire and this was later supported by resolution of the Flintshire justices of the peace. However, when local government legislation was introduced no change was made.

Under the Local Government Act 1894 the area became Overton Rural District, remaining as a detached part of Flintshire until 1974.

Between 1974 and 1996 Overton was administered as part of the short-lived county of Clwyd. The community (parish) and county boundary between it and Erbistock (in historic Denbighshire) is, in part, on the west side of the river due to oxbow formation in the river. It is now in Wrexham borough.

St Mary the Virgin Church and its yew trees 

The churchyard of St Mary the Virgin dominates the high street and is famous for twenty-one very ancient yew trees.  The yew trees are traditionally one of the Seven Wonders of Wales and are commemorated in an anonymously written rhyme:

Pistyll Rhaeadr and Wrexham steeple,
Snowdon's mountain without its people,
Overton yew trees, St Winefride wells,
Llangollen bridge, and Gresford bells.

At 1,500 to 2,000 years old, the oldest tree predates the church, whose earliest stonework is probably Norman.  In 1992 the village celebrated the 700th anniversary of the granting of a Royal Charter to Overton by Edward I in 1292 with a royal visit from the former Queen who planted a new yew tree.

Buildings and heritage 
Overton has a fine collection of 18th and 19th-century buildings, many of which are listed as buildings of architectural or historic interest. Even the old telephone box has been "listed". The village centre is also designated as a Conservation Area.

Most of the village was once owned by the Bryn-y-pys Estate. It was made clear that the estate wielded "Great Political Influence", as without the secret ballot at general elections, the purchaser, who would be virtually everyone's landlord, was guaranteed of a place in Parliament.

There are several interesting buildings in the village including: the "Cocoa and Reading Rooms", a terracotta building of 1890, built to promulgate temperance, now the library; almshouses and a Victorian village pump.

Governance
An electoral ward in the same name exists. This ward stretches south east to Maelor South and at the 2011 census had a total population of 3,315.

Recreation 
The village has the usual sporting recreational areas of cricket, football, bowls and tennis. Overton is also an excellent rendezvous point for walkers as it finds itself on the map of the Maelor Way, a 24 mile (38 km) long-distance footpath; this in turn links up with Offa's Dyke Path National Trail at Bronygarth and the Sandstone Trail, Llangollen Canal, South Cheshire Way, and the Marches Way.

People
St. Richard Gwyn (ca. 1537 – 15 October 1584), Overton village schoolmaster, Elizabethan era composer of Welsh poetry, and Roman Catholic martyr. Canonized in 1970 by Pope Paul VI as one of the Forty Martyrs of England and Wales.

Further reading 
 Gordon Emery – Guide to the Maelor Way (1991) 
 Gordon Emery – Curious Clwyd (1994) 
 Gordon Emery – Curious Clwyd 2 (1996)

References

External links 

 St Mary The Virgin Church (Open Church Network)
 Overton-on-Dee website (Overton Community Council)
 photos of Overton-on-Dee on geograph

History of Flintshire
Villages in Wrexham County Borough
Tourist attractions in Wrexham County Borough
Landmarks in Wales
Communities in Wrexham County Borough